is a former Japanese football player and manager. He played for Japan national team.

Club career
Ikeuchi was born in Aichi Prefecture on August 25, 1961. After graduating from high school, he joined his local club, the Toyoda Automatic Loom Works in 1980. In 1981, he moved to the Japan Soccer League club Fujita Industries. In 1981, the club won the championship of the Japan Soccer League. In 1990, the club was relegated to Division 2. In 1992, the club won the championship in Division 2 and joined the new Japan Football League. In 1993, the club won the championship and was promoted to the J1 League, which started in 1994. However, he retired in 1993, and never played in the J.League.

National team career
On February 12, 1983, Ikeuchi debuted for Japan national team against Syria. He played at 1984 Summer Olympics qualification and 1986 World Cup qualification. He played 8 games for Japan until 1985.

Coaching career
In 2007, Ikeuchi became the manager for Japan U-17 national team. He managed at 2009 U-17 World Cup.

Club statistics

National team statistics

References

External links

Japan National Football Team Database

1961 births
Living people
Association football people from Aichi Prefecture
Japanese footballers
Japan international footballers
Japan Soccer League players
Japan Football League (1992–1998) players
Toyota Industries SC players
Shonan Bellmare players
Japanese football managers
Association football defenders